Light as a Feather is an American supernatural thriller television series, based on the book of the same name by Zoe Aarsen, that premiered on October 12, 2018, on Hulu. The series was created by R. Lee Fleming Jr. and stars Liana Liberato, Haley Ramm, Ajiona Alexus, Brianne Tju, Peyton List, Jordan Rodrigues, Dylan Sprayberry, Brent Rivera, Dorian Brown Pham, Robyn Lively, Katelyn Nacon, Kira Kosarin, Froy Gutierrez, Adriyan Rae, and Alex Wasabi. On July 26, 2019, the first part of the second season, consisting of eight episodes, premiered on Hulu. The second part of the second season was released on Hulu on October 4, 2019.

Premise
Light as a Feather follows "five teen girls as they deal with the supernatural fallout stemming from an innocent game of 'Light as a Feather, Stiff as a Board'. When the girls start dying off in the exact way that was predicted, the survivors must figure out why they're being targeted — and whether the evil force hunting them down is one of their own."

Cast and characters

Main
 Liana Liberato as McKenna Brady, a shy and popular high school senior and child of divorce. She used to date Henry before his disappearance and now dates Trey. Liberato also portrays Jennie Brady, Mckenna's late twin sister, in a recurring role. McKenna is now under the influence of the game and struggles to overcome the curse.
 Haley Ramm as Violet Simmons, a new student at school who recently moved to town with a mysterious secret. She is now free from the game's curse and is dating Isaac.
 Brianne Tju as Alex Portnoy, a popular dancer at school who is dating Peri, while being a cursed player
 Ajiona Alexus as Candace Preston (season 1; guest, season 2), a popular girl at school who is constantly compared to Olivia. She dated Olivia's boyfriend, Isaac, in secret.
 Peyton List as Olivia Richmond (season 1; guest, season 2), the wealthy leader of the popular girls at school, Henry's younger sister, and Isaac's former girlfriend
 Brent Rivera as Isaac Salcedo, a popular high school senior and Candace's and Olivia's former boyfriend. He later dates Violet and is a cursed player.
 Jordan Rodrigues as Trey Emory, McKenna's next-door neighbor and a former member of Sammi's band who dated McKenna and later Sammi. He is a new cursed player.
 Dylan Sprayberry as Henry Richmond, an athletic college student and Olivia's older brother who dated McKenna before he was kidnapped.
 Katelyn Nacon as Sammi Karras (season 2), leader and singer of a band, Trey's ex-girlfriend, and one of the new cursed players
Adriyan Rae as Peri Boudreaux (season 2), Alex's love interest and a college student

Recurring
 Dorian Brown Pham (season 1) and Robyn Lively (season 2) as Deb Brady, McKenna and Jennie's mother
 Chachi Gonzales as Noreen Listerman (season 1), a classmate of the main group and in the dance group with Alex
 Shelley Robertson as Gloria Preston (season 1), Candace's mother
 Nancy Linehan Charles as Judith (season 1), Violet's grandmother
 Timi Prulhiere as Mrs. Regan, a mother who lost her son, Marc, to the curse.
 Harley Graham as Lena Regan, Marc's sister who knows about Violet's prediction
 Kira Kosarin as Nadia Abrams (season 2), an inquisitive barista and one of the new cursed players
 Froy Gutierrez as Ridge Reyes (season 2), a high school student who needs to perform community service, and is one of the new cursed players
 Alisa Allapach as April Portnoy (season 2), Alex's condescending and stuck-up older sister who is a pre-med.
 Alex Wassabi as Luke Chiba (season 2), a high school student who needs to perform community service
 Alan and Alex Stokes (season 2), twins and friends of Sammi
 Brooke Star as Lisa Salcedo (season 2), Isaac's younger sister
 Brea Bee as Sylvia Gallagher (season 2), Peri's accomplice and former nanny
 Alexander Baudo as Aaron Gleeson (season 2)
Eric Brenner as Charlie Simmons (season 2), Violet's father

Guest
 Leah Lewis as Gabby Darwish, (Season 1, Ep. 9: "... Innocent as a Lamb")
 Alex Lange as Marc Regan, (Season 1, Ep. 9: "... Innocent as a Lamb"), Violet's boyfriend when she was first cursed. He and Violet played the game together and he sacrificed his life for her.
Julia Rose as Mrs. Richmond ("...Dead as a Doornail")
 Timothy Davis-Reed as cop ("...Slippery as an Eel")
 John Tague as Ed Brady ("...Cold as Ice")
 Simmi Singh as Jess ("...Thick as Thieves")
 Julie Benz as Skye Karras ("...Guilty as Sin")

Episodes

Season 1 (2018)

Season 2 (2019)

Production

Development
On October 8, 2017, it was announced that Hulu had given the production a series order for a first season consisting of ten episodes. The series was created by Lee Fleming Jr. and is based on the book Light as a Feather, Stiff as a Board by Zoe Aarsen. Fleming Jr. is also expected to executive produce alongside Jordan Levin, Shelley Zimmerman, Joe Davola and Brett Bouttier, Aron Levitz, Eric Lehrman, Kelsey Grammer, Tom Russo, Brian Sher, and Stella Bulochnikov. Kailey Marsh is set to act as co-executive producer. Production companies involved with the series include AwesomenessTV, Wattpad, and Grammnet Productions. On June 4, 2018, it was announced that Alexis Ostrander would direct the first two episodes and serve as a co-executive producer for the series. On August 13, 2018, it was announced that the series would premiere on October 12, 2018. On February 5, 2019, it was announced that the series had been renewed for a second season consisting of sixteen episodes.

Casting
On June 4, 2018, it was announced that Liana Liberato, Haley Ramm, Ajiona Alexus, Brianne Tju, Peyton List, Dylan Sprayberry, Jordan Rodrigues, Brent Rivera, and Dorian Brown Pham had been cast in the series' main roles. On February 5, 2019, it was confirmed that Liberato, Ramm, and Tju would return for the second season. On April 3, 2019, it was confirmed that Rodrigues, Sprayberry, and Rivera would return for the second season. On April 3, 2019, it was also announced that Katelyn Nacon, Kira Kosarin, Froy Gutierrez, Adriyan Rae, Alex Wassabi, Alisa Allapach, Robyn Lively, and Alan and Alex Stokes would join the cast for the second season.

Filming
Principal photography for the series began on June 4, 2018, and ended on July 31, 2018, in Los Angeles, California.

Reception
The series has been met with a mixed response from critics upon its premiere. On the review aggregation website Rotten Tomatoes, the first season holds a 50% approval rating with critics with an average rating of 4.75 out of 10 based on 10 reviews.

Awards and nominations

References

External links
 

2010s American horror television series
2010s American supernatural television series
2010s American teen drama television series
2018 American television series debuts
2019 American television series endings
Awesomeness (company)
English-language television shows
Hulu original programming
Television shows based on American novels
Television series about teenagers
Television shows filmed in Los Angeles
Works by R. Lee Fleming Jr.